Alexandra Engen (born 5 January 1988) is a Swedish cross country cyclist. Engen qualified for the 2012 Summer Olympics in London and finished 6th in the final. She lives in Freiburg im Breisgau, Germany. Engen is two-time world champion in cross-country eliminator.

World Cup podiums

References

Swedish female cyclists
Olympic cyclists of Sweden
Cyclists at the 2012 Summer Olympics
1988 births
Living people
UCI Mountain Bike World Champions (women)
People from Sarpsborg